is a former Japanese football player.

Playing career
Nakada was born in Yamanashi Prefecture on October 4, 1973. After graduating from Aoyama Gakuin University, he joined Japan Football League club Ventforet Kofu based in his local in 1996. He became a regular player as center back from first season and the club was promoted to new league J2 League from 1999. Although he played many matches for a long time, the club finished at bottom place for 3 years in a row (1999-2001). His opportunity to play decreased from 2002. Although he could not play at all in the match in 2005, the club won 3rd place and was promoted to J1 League from 2006. However he retired end of 2005 season without playing J1.

Club statistics

References

External links

1973 births
Living people
Aoyama Gakuin University alumni
Association football people from Yamanashi Prefecture
Japanese footballers
J2 League players
Japan Football League (1992–1998) players
Ventforet Kofu players
Association football defenders
J3 League managers
FC Gifu managers
YSCC Yokohama managers
Japanese football managers